Antoine du Pérac Lafréry (1512–1577), better known as Antonio Lafreri, was a Burgundian engraver, cartographer and publisher active in Rome.

Born at Orgelet in the County of Burgundy, then part of the Holy Roman Empire, Lafreri settled in Rome around 1540. His most important work is the so-called Lafreri atlases, published in Rome in 1570, one of the first organic collection of printed maps, having on its frontespice the figure of Atlas holding the earth. Reproductions of the City of Naples (cit. Miradois Palace), dated 1566, are on display at the Museum of San Martino in Naples. For the Atlas he collaborated with the most important Italian cartographers of the time: Giacomo Gastaldi, Battista Agnese, Antonio Salamanca, Francesco Camocio the Younger, Donato Bertelli, Ferando Bertelli and Paolo Forlani.

In 1575 he finished the Speculum Romanae Magnificentiae, a collection of 200 engravings of Rome, organized in three volumes. He died at Rome in 1577.

In 2014 the Bavarian State Library bought from a private collector the Atlases of Lafrery  for 1.4 million euro.

Notes

External links 

 Lafreri map of Asia, 1561 Eran Laor Cartographic Collection. The National Library of Israel

1512 births
1577 deaths
16th-century cartographers
16th-century French people
People from Franche-Comté